Lombok Institute of Flight Technology, also known as LIFT, is an Indonesian higher learning institution specializing in theoretical and practical aeronautical science education. Based on Lombok island (approx 60 miles east of Bali island) the institute received its educational accreditation as a flight academy from Directorate General of Civil Aviation of Indonesia in 2010. The institute operated from Selaparang Airport in Mataram until this airport closed and later moved to Lombok International Airport, Bima Airport and Sultan Muhammad Kaharuddin III Airport.

History
Established since 2011, the Lombok Institute of Flight Technology with a pilot school certificate license number 141D-012 from the Ministry of Transportation, Director General of Civil Aviation, Lombok Institute of Flight Technology (LIFT) has started flying its wings and operating at Selaparang Airport, Mataram City. Lombok Institute of Flight has produced more than 200 professional pilots who are currently scattered in several national and international airlines. One of the pride and priorities that LIFT offers is the creation of superior pilot human resources who have high quality, therefore LIFT prioritizes One of the qualities in
educating and training prospective professional pilot candidates is the supporting program facilities in carrying out the education and training process. Early 2020 the Lombok Institute of Flight Technology changed ownership by a
native son who was born in Lombok, Mr. Lalu Didiek Yuliadi, SE. in a strategic vision and mission with the principle of "pilot technical knowledge & skill as priority" as well as complementing and adding several training facilities in educating and training prospective professional pilot pilots, upholding the quality, safety and comfort of students in undergoing the educational process and training, the Lombok Institute of Flight Technology (LIFT) adds several systems to its program, in order to support the creation of Good Corporate Governance and the Goal of True Education. in 2018 LIFT earned its accreditation from International Education Accreditation (IEDACC).

Facilities
The fight training campus is located in Senggigi resort area on the island of Lombok, West Nusa Tengara in Indonesia. 
A satellite campus (academics only) is located in Serpong, Tangerang, in West Jakarta

Satellite facilities are located in Selaparang International Airport, in Lombok International Airport, Nusa Alam in Jakarta and Sumbawa Besar Regional Airport in Sumbawa

LIFT purchased its first fleet of six Liberty XL2 flight training aircraft from Liberty Aerospace Corporation in Melbourne, Florida, in 2010 and shipped them to Johor Bahru to be later ferried to Lombok. It owns and operates five Liberty XL2 aircraft, both Classic and Vingard editions.

The flight simulation department houses two full-motion flight simulators capable of semi-realistic reproduction of flight in Liberty XL2 aircraft.

Academics
The institute offers professional pilots courses in the following areas of aeronautical theory:
Basic Aerodynamics
Advanced Aerodynamics
General Navigation
Radio Navigation
Meteorology
Aircraft Systems
Instrumentation & Electronics
Radio Theory
Operational Procedures
Aircraft Weight & Balance

Faculty and staff
Key persons in the flight department in 2012 are Chief Flight Instructor Russell Sherwood.

References

External links
 
 Indonesian media publication

Colleges in Indonesia
Aviation in Indonesia
Lombok